The Siddi, also known as the Sheedi, Sidi, or Siddhi, or Habshi are an ethnic group inhabiting India and Pakistan. They are primarily descended from the Bantu peoples of the Zanj coast in Southeast Africa and Ethiopia, most whom arrived to the indian subcontinent through the Arab Slave Trade. Others arrived as merchants, sailors, indentured servants, and mercenaries. The Siddi population is currently estimated at around 850,000 individuals, with Karnataka, Gujarat and Hyderabad in India and Makran and Karachi in Pakistan serving as the main population centres. Siddis are primarily Muslims, although some are Hindus and others belong to the Catholic Church.

Although often economically and socially marginalised as a community today, Siddis have played large roles in the politics of the subcontinent. The most famous Siddi, Malik Ambar, effectively controlled the Ahmadnagar Sultanate in the Deccan. He played a major role, politically and militarily, in Indian history by limiting the penetration of the Mughal power into the Deccan Plateau.

Etymology 

There are conflicting hypotheses on the origin of the name Siddi. One theory is that the word derives from sahibi, an Arabic term of respect in North Africa, similar to the word sahib in modern India and Pakistan. A second theory is that the term Siddi is derived from the title borne by the captains of the Arab vessels that first brought Siddi settlers to India; these captains were known as Sayyid.

Similarly, another term for Siddis, habshi, is held to be derived from Al-Habash, Arabic for Abyssinia, whence came the ships that first delivered Siddi slaves to the subcontinent. Siddis are also sometimes referred to as Afro-Indians. Siddis were referred to as Zanji by Arabs; in China, various transcriptions of this Arabic word were used, including Xinji (辛吉) and Jinzhi (津芝).

History 

The first Siddis are thought to have arrived in India in 628 AD at the Bharuch port. Several others followed with the first Arab Islamic conquest of the subcontinent in 712 AD. The latter group are believed to have been soldiers with Muhammad bin Qasim's Arab army, and were called Zanjis.

Some Siddis escaped slavery to establish communities in forested areas, and some also established the small Siddi principalities of Janjira State on Janjira Island and Jafarabad State in Kathiawar as early as the twelfth century. A former alternative name of Janjira was Habshan (i.e., land of the Habshis). In the Delhi Sultanate period prior to the rise of the Mughals in India, Jamal-ud-Din Yaqut was a prominent former Siddi slave who was appointed by Razia Sultana (1235–1240 CE) as master of the royal stables. It is speculated that he may also have been her lover, but the contemporary sources provide no evidence of this. Siddis for brief period ruled Bengal as the Habshi dynasty of the Bengal Sultanate.

Siddis were also brought as slaves by the Deccan Sultanates. Several former slaves rose to high ranks in the military and administration, the most prominent of which was Malik Ambar.

Later, the Siddi population was increased by Bantu peoples from Southeast Africa who were brought to the Indian subcontinent as slaves by the Portuguese. Most of these migrants were or else became Muslims, while a small minority became Hindu. The Nizam of Hyderabad also employed African-origin guards and soldiers.

Geographical Distribution

India 

Harris (1971) provides a historical survey of the eastward dispersal of slaves from Southeast Africa to places like India. Hamilton (1990) argues that Siddis in South India are a significant social group whose histories, experiences, cultures, and expressions are integral to the African Diaspora and thus, help better understand the dynamics of dispersed peoples. More recent focused scholarship argues that although Siddis are numerically a minority, their historic presence in India for over five hundred years, as well as their self-perception, and how the broader Indian society relates to them, make them a distinct Bantu/Indian. Historically, Siddis have not existed only within binary relations to the nation state and imperial forces. They did not simply succumb to the ideologies and structures of imperial forces, nor did they simply rebel against imperial rule. The Siddi are recognized as a scheduled tribe in 3 states and 1 union territory: Goa, Gujarat, Maharashtra, Karnataka and Daman and Diu.

Hyderabad
In the 18th century, a Siddi community was established in Hyderabad State by the Arab Siddi diaspora, who have frequently served as cavalry guards to the Asif Jahi Nizam of Hyderabad's army. The Asif Jahi rulers patronised them with rewards and the traditional Marfa music gained popularity and would be performed during official celebrations and ceremonies. The Siddis of Hyderabad have traditionally resided in the A.C. Guards (African Cavalry Guards) area near Masjid Rahmania, known locally as Siddi Risala in the city and in Habsiguda named after the Habishis in Hyderabad.

Gujarat 

Supposedly presented as slaves by the Portuguese to the local Prince, Nawab of Junagadh, the Siddis also live around Gir Forest National Park and Wildlife sanctuary. On the way to Deva-dungar is the village of Sirvan, inhabited entirely by Siddis. They were brought 300 years ago from Portuguese colonial territories for the Nawab of Junagadh. Today, they follow very few of their original customs, with a few exceptions like the traditional Dhamal dance.

Although Gujarati Siddis have adopted the language and many customs of their surrounding populations, some of their Bantu traditions have been preserved. These include the Goma music and dance form, which is sometimes called Dhamaal (Gujarati: ધમાલ, fun). The term is believed to be derived from the Ngoma drumming and traditional dance forms of the Bantu people inhabiting Central, East and Southern Africa. The Goma also has a spiritual significance and, at the climax of the dance, some dancers are believed to be vehicles for the presence of Siddi saints of the past.

Goma music comes from the Kiswahili word "ngoma", which means a drum or drums. It also denotes any dancing occasion where traditional drums are principally used.

The majority of the Siddis in Gujarat are Muslims (98.7%), with very few following Hinduism (1%).

Maharashtra 
In Marathi, the state language of Maharashtra, the word habshi (हाबशी) is used to denote people of African (typically Ethiopian) origin. The powerful naval presence of Siddi Johar (Zoher) in Murud, Raigad district, is evidence of their presence. This is exemplified by the sea-fort of Murud-Janjira, and the Khokha tombs of the Siddis also stand as evidence of a past glory. Additional relics are near Junnar, where the so-called Habshi mahal (palace) ruins still stand

Karnataka 

The Siddis of Karnataka (also spelled Siddhis) are an ethnic group of mainly Bantu descent that has made Karnataka their home for the last 400 years. There is a 50,000-strong Siddhi population across India, of which more than a third live in Karnataka. In Karnataka, they are concentrated around Yellapur, Haliyal, Ankola, Joida, Mundgod and Sirsi taluks of Uttara Kannada and in Khanapur of Belgaum and Kalaghatagi of Dharwad district. Many members of the Siddis community of Karnataka had migrated to Pakistan after independence and have settled in Karachi, Sindh. It has been reported that these Siddis believe that Barack Obama shares their genepool. They wished to gift him and honour him on his visit to India in 2010.

A plurality of the Siddis in Karnataka follow Hinduism (41.8%), followed by Islam (30.6%) and Christianity (27.4%).

Pakistan 
In Pakistan, locals of Bantu descent are called "Sheedi". They live primarily along the Makran in Balochistan, and lower Sindh. The estimated population of Sheedis in Pakistan is 250,000. In the city of Karachi, the main Sheedi centre is the area of Lyari and other nearby coastal areas. Technically, the Sheedi are a brotherhood or a subdivision of the Siddi. The Sheedis are divided into four clans, or houses: Kharadar Makan, Hyderabad Makan, Lassi Makan and Belaro Makan. The Sufi saint Pir Mangho is regarded by many as an important Wali of the Sheedis, and the annual Sheedi Mela festival, is the key event in the Sheedi community's cultural calendar. Some glimpses of the rituals at Sidi/Sheedi Festival 2010 include visit to sacred alligators at Mangho pir, playing music and dance. Clearly, the instrument, songs and dance appear to be derived from Africa.

In Sindh, the Sheedis have traditionally intermarried only with people such as the Mallaahs (fisherpeople), Khaskheli (laborers), Khatri (dyeing community) and Kori (clothmakers). Most Sheedis today are of mixed heritage and can be found in Sindh where the main language is Sindhi.

Famous Sheedis include the historic Sindhi army leader Hoshu Sheedi and Urdu poet Noon Meem Danish. Sheedis are also well known for their excellence in sports, especially in football and boxing. Qasim Umer is one cricketer who played for Pakistan in 80s. The musical anthem of the ruling Pakistan Peoples Party, "Bija Teer", is a Balochi song in the musical style of the Sheedis with African style rhythm and drums. Younis Jani is a popular Sheedi singer famous for singing an Urdu version of the reggaeton song "Papi chulo... (te traigo el mmmm...)."

Sindh

Sheedis are largely populated in different towns and villages in lower Sindh. They are very active in cultural activities and organise annual festivals, like, Habash Festival, with the support of several community organisations. In the local culture, when there is a dance it is not performed by some selected few and watched idly by others but it is participated by all the people present there, ending difference between the performers and the audience.

Sheedis in Sindh also proudly call themselves the Qambranis, in reverence to Qambar, the freed slave of Ali, the fourth Rashid Caliph. Tanzeela Qambrani became the first Sheedi woman to be elected as the member of Provincial Assembly of Sindh in 2018 Pakistani general election.

Bengal

Although there are no records of a Siddi community in Bengal today, the population was known to have inhabited the country historically where they were referred to as Habshi by the Bengalis. As eunuchs, they gained influential positions under the Bengal Sultanate, most prominently as paiks and palace-guards during the reign of Sultan Jalaluddin Fateh Shah. This Sultan was later assassinated under a coup led by the Habshi commander of the palace-guards, who seized control of Bengal as Shahzada Barbak, and began a seven-year Habshi occupation in Bengal. Barbak only ruled for several months, being replaced by another Habshi, Malik Andil, who was the army commander of the former dynasty. Andil took the name Saifuddin Firuz Shah and became the most prominent Habshi Sultan of Bengal, by patronising architecture and calligraphy. It is said that Sidi Badr had over 5000 Habshis in his army. In 1494, his wazir (chief minister) Sayyid Husain led a rebellion in which Sidi Badr was killed. He subsequently removed all Habshis from administrative posts, ending Habshi rule in Bengal. Many Habshis eventually migrated to Gujarat and the Deccan.

The Habshi community can be seen to have flourished as late as the colonial period. In Chittagong, a Habshi slave-boy known as Zamor was captured by British slave traders in 1773, who trafficked him into France via Madagascar and sold him to King Louis XV of France. Mansur Ali Khan, the final Nawab of Bengal, married a former Habshi slave girl, Mehr Lekha Begum Sahiba (Guiti Afroz Mahal, Hasina Khanum). They had several children including Hassan Ali Mirza (first Nawab of Murshidabad) and Wahid Ali Mirza. She died in Murshidabad on 30 May 1855 and was buried at the Jafarganj Cemetery.

Genetics
Recent advances in genetic analyses have helped shed some light on the ethnogenesis of the Siddi. Genetic genealogy, although a novel tool that uses the genes of modern populations to trace their ethnic and geographic origins, has also helped clarify the possible background of the modern Siddi.

Y DNA
A Y-chromosome study by Shah et al. (2011) tested Siddi individuals in India for paternal lineages. The authors observed the E1b1a1-M2 haplogroup, which is frequent among Bantu peoples, in about 42% and 34% of Siddis from Karnataka and Gujarat, respectively. Around 14% of Siddis from Karnataka and 35% of Siddis from Gujarat also belonged to the Sub-Saharan B-M60. The remaining Siddis had Indian associated or Near Eastern-linked clades, including haplogroups P, H, R1a-M17, J2 and L-M20.

Thangaraj (2009) observed similar, mainly Bantu-linked paternal affinities amongst the Siddi.

Qamar et al. (2002) analysed Makrani Sheedis in Pakistan and found that they instead predominantly carried Indian-associated or Near Eastern-linked haplogroups. R1a1a-M17 (30.30%), J2 (18.18%) and R2 (18.18%) were their most common male lineages. Only around 12% carried Africa-derived clades, which mainly consisted of the archaic haplogroup B-M60, of which they bore the highest frequency of any Pakistani population Underhill et al. (2009) likewise detected a relatively high frequency of R1a1a-M17 (25%) subclade among Makrani Sheedis.

mtDNA
According to an mtDNA study by Shah et al. (2011), the maternal ancestry of the Siddi consists of a mixture of Bantu-associated haplogroups and Indian-associated haplogroups, reflecting substantial female gene flow from neighbouring Indian populations. About 53% of the Siddis from Gujarat and 24% of the Siddis from Karnataka belonged to various Bantu-derived macro-haplogroup L subclades. The latter mainly consisted of L0 and L2a sublineages associated with Bantu women. The remainder possessed Indian-specific subclades of the Eurasian haplogroups M and N, which points to recent admixture with autochthonous Indian groups.

Autosomal DNA
Narang et al. (2011) examined the autosomal DNA of Siddis in India. According to the researchers, about 58% of the Siddis' ancestry is derived from Bantu peoples. The remainder is associated with locals North and Northwest Indian populations, due to recent admixture events.

Similarly, Shah et al. (2011) observed that Siddis in Gujarat derive 66.90%–70.50% of their ancestry from Bantu forebears, while the Siddis in Karnataka possess 64.80%–74.40% such Southeast African ancestry. The remaining autosomal DNA components in the studied Siddi were mainly associated with local South Asian populations. According to the authors, gene flow between the Siddis' Bantu ancestors and local Indian populations was also largely unidirectional. They estimate this admixture episode's time of occurrence at within the past 200 years or eight generations.

However, Guha et al. (2012) observed few genetic differences between the Makrani of Pakistan and adjacent populations. According to the authors, the genome-wide ancestry of the Makrani was essentially the same as that of the neighboring Indo-European speaking Balochi and Dravidian-speaking Brahui.

Culture 
The culture of the Siddi is indicative of both the length of time they have been in India and their East African origins. National dress for Siddis is Sari, Kameez and their own traditional African clothing for women, for the men they wear kameez and their unique clothing. While they have assimilated in many ways to the dominant culture, they have also kept some ancestral practices especially in music and dance. Like other ethnic groups separated by geography, there are both differences and similarities in cultural practices among the Siddi.

Generally, the Siddi primarily associate and marry members of their own communities. It is rare for the Siddi to marry outside of their communities although in Pakistan a growing number of the Sheedi intermarry as a way to dilute their African lineage and reduce racial discrimination and prejudice.

Siddi communities, although classified as a tribe by the Indian government, primarily live in agricultural communities where men are responsible for the farming and women are responsible for the home and children. Outside of their communities, men also tend to be employed as farm hands, drivers, manual laborers, and security guards.

When it comes to dress, women and men dress in typical Indian fashion. Siddi women wear the garments predominant in their locale, which can be colorful saris accessorised with bindis. Men wear what is generally appropriate for men in their communities.

As in other aspects of life, the Siddi have adopted the common dietary practices of the dominant society. An example of a staple meal would be a large portions of rice with dal and pickles.

Athletics has been an important part of the Siddi community and has been a means to uplift youth and a means of escape from poverty and discrimination.

Notable people

 Jamal-ud-Din Yaqut (died 1240), confidante of Razia Sultana
 Yakut Khan (died 1733), naval admiral
 Hoshu Sheedi (1801-1843), Siddi commander
 Hasan Ali Mirza, First Nawab of Murshidabad
  Muhammad Siddique Musafir (1879-1961, Tando Bago, Sindh) Siddi Poet and Teacher
 Noon Meem Danish (born 1958), Urdu poet
 Abdul Rashid Qambrani (born 1975), Pakistani boxer
 Malik Ambar (1548-1626), regent of the Ahmadnagar Sultanate
 Tanzeela Qambrani (born 1979, Tando Bago, Sindh), Pakistani politician, member of the Provincial Assembly of Sindh
 Zamor (1762-1820), Jacobin French revolutionary of possibly Siddi origin from Bengal. He, as a boy of 11, was taken from Chittagong, Bengal Subah, Mughal Empire (now Bangladesh) by slave traders.
 Shantaram Siddi, member of the Karnataka Legislative Council.
 Girija Siddi, Hindustani Classical Singer, in Karnataka.

Films and books 
 From Africa...To Indian Subcontinent: Sidi Music in the Indian Ocean Diaspora (2003) by Amy Catlin-Jairazbhoy, in close collaboration with Nazir Ali Jairazbhoy and the Sidi community.
 Mon petit diable (My Little Devil) (1999) was directed by Gopi Desai. Om Puri, Pooja Batra, Rushabh Patni, Satyajit Sharma.
 Razia Sultan  (1983), an Indian Urdu film directed by Kamal Amrohi, is based on the life of Razia Sultan (played by Hema Malini) (1205–1240), the only female Sultan of Delhi (1236–1240), and her speculated love affair with the Abyssinian slave Jamal-ud-Din Yakut (played by Dharmendra). He was referred to in the movie as a habshee.
 A Certain Grace: The Sidi, Indians of African Descent by Ketaki Sheth, Photolink, 2013.
 Shaping Membership, Defining Nation: The Cultural Politics of African Indians in South Asia (2007) by Pashington Obeng.
 Inside a Lost African Tribe Still Living in India Today (2018) by Asha Stuart
 #unfair (2019) a film produced by Public Service Broadcast Trust directed by Wenceslaus Mendes, Paranjoy Guha Thakurta, Anushka Matthews, Mohit Bhalla

See also 
 Afro-Iranians
 Afro-Asians in South Asia
 Africa–India relations
 Sri Lanka Kaffirs
 List of Scheduled Tribes in India

References

External links 

 "Karnataka's Indian-African Tribe", The Wall Street Journal, 26 March 2012.
 Alice Albinia, Empires of the Indus, W. W. Norton & Company, 2010, 52–78.
 Shanti Sadiq Ali, The African Dispersal in the Deccan: From Medieval to Modern Times, Orient Blackswan, 1996.
 Ababu Minda Yimene, An African Indian Community in Hyderabad: Siddi Identity, Its Maintenance and Change, Cuvillier Verlag, 2004, p. 201.
 Omar H. Ali, The African Diaspora in India, Schomburg Center for Research in Black Culture, The New York Public Library.
 Abdulaziz Y. Lodhi, "Bantu origins of the Sidis of India", in Pambazuka News, 29 October 2008.
 "Siddi Jana Vikas Sanga", 5 February 2011.
 Indians of African Origin
 "Black, Indian, and a Hindu", African Connection.
 "Habshis and Siddis – Africans and African descendants in South Asia", ColorQ World.
 The Global African Community/Great Habshis in Ethiopian/Indian History
 History of the Ethiopian Diaspora
 Shihan de Silva Jayasuriya, "South Asia's Africans: A Forgotten People", History Workshop, 5 February 2011.
 Andrew Whitehead, "The lost Africans of India", BBC News, 27 November 2000.
 BBC "In pictures: India's African communities", BBC News.
 Lord of All He Surveys, The Express Travel

 
Ethnic groups in India
Ethnic groups in Pakistan
People of African descent
Muslim communities of India
Muslim communities of Karnataka
Sindhi tribes
Africa–Pakistan relations
Africa–India relations
Social groups of Gujarat
Social groups of Balochistan, Pakistan
Social groups of Sindh
Social groups of Karnataka
Tribal communities of Gujarat
Muslim communities of Gujarat
African diaspora in India
African diaspora in Pakistan
Immigration to India
Immigration to Pakistan